Joseph Malone VC (11 January 1833 – 28 June 1883) was an English recipient of the Victoria Cross, the highest and most prestigious award for gallantry in the face of the enemy that can be awarded to British and Commonwealth forces.

VC action
He was 21 years old, and a sergeant in the 13th Light Dragoons (later 13th Hussars), British Army during the Crimean War when the following deed took place for which he was awarded the VC.

On 25 October 1854 at Balaclava, Crimean Peninsula (Charge of the Light Brigade), Sergeant Malone, while returning on foot from the charge, in which his horse had been shot, stopped under very heavy fire and helped a troop sergeant-major (John Berryman) and other sergeant (John Farrell) to move a very severely wounded officer (who subsequently died) out of range of the guns.

Further details
Malone was from Eccles in Lancashire. He later transferred to the 6th Dragoons and in 1858 was commissioned as a Riding Master. In 1881, along with other riding masters, he was granted the honorary rank of Captain.

After Crimea Malone found himself with the 6th Dragoons billeted in Pinetown, South Africa. The registers of the Pinetown Library show that Malone borrowed two books on 5 May 1883, but was not able to return because he became ill, and died on 28 June. He is buried in the small cemetery in what was the old St Andrews churchyard off Kings Road. An account of his funeral reads: "His body was brought from the Rugby Hotel on a gun carriage drawn by soldiers, his horse led in front of it, his boots hanging reversed from the saddle, with his sword and knapsack rolled on it, the helmet resting on the coffin. The band played the Dead March and the men moved along the road slowly and majestically to the solemn sounds; and we children were moved to tears with the pathos and marvel of it all." 

His Victoria Cross was acquired by Lord Ashcroft in 2017 and is displayed at the Imperial War Museum, London as part of the Lord Ashcroft VC collection.

He was the grandfather of the stage actress Patricia Malone.

References

 

1833 births
1883 deaths
6th (Inniskilling) Dragoons officers
13th Hussars soldiers
British Army personnel of the Crimean War
British Army recipients of the Victoria Cross
Crimean War recipients of the Victoria Cross
People from Eccles, Greater Manchester